Yva Richard was a French fetishwear company of the early 20th century, run by Nativa Richard and her husband.
They founded the company a few weeks before the outbreak of World War I. By the late 1920s, it had become a successful mail-order business. One of their most notorious designs was a studded steel cone bra and chastity belt with a plumed headdress. Their main competitor was Diana Slip.

References 

Lingerie retailers
20th-century fashion
Fetish clothing
Clothing companies of France